Chelis buraetica is a moth in the family Erebidae. It was described by Otto Bang-Haas in 1927. It is found in Russia (Altai, Tuva, Sayan, Baikal, Transbaikalia, Yakutia) and Mongolia.

This species was moved from the genus Sibirarctia to Chelis as a result of phylogenetic research published in 2016.

Subspecies
Chelis buraetica buraetica (south-eastern Atlai, Tuva, Baikal, Transbaikalia, central Yakutia, Mongolia)
Chelis buraetica chajataensis Dubatolov, 1996 (mountains of eastern Yakutia)
Chelis buraetica validus (O.Bang-Haas, 1927) (south-western Transbaikalia)

References

Moths described in 1927
Arctiina
Taxa named by Otto Bang-Haas